The Main Event – Live is a live album and television special by Frank Sinatra from 1974.

Track listing
Overture: "It Was a Very Good Year"/"All the Way"/"My Kind of Town" (Ervin Drake)/(Sammy Cahn, Jimmy Van Heusen)/(Cahn, Van Heusen) – 3:12 (introduction by Howard Cosell)
"The Lady Is a Tramp" (Lorenz Hart, Richard Rodgers) – 3:02
"I Get a Kick Out of You" (Cole Porter) – 4:37
"Let Me Try Again (Laisse Moi le Temps)" (Paul Anka, Cahn, Michel Jourdon, Caravelli) – 3:26
"Autumn in New York" (Vernon Duke) – 2:45
"I've Got You Under My Skin" (Porter) – 4:44
"Bad, Bad Leroy Brown" (Jim Croce) – 2:49
"Angel Eyes" (Earl Brent, Matt Dennis) – 8:32
"You Are the Sunshine of My Life" (Stevie Wonder) – 2:49
"The House I Live In (That's America to Me)" (Lewis Allan, Earl Robinson) – 6:41
"My Kind of Town" – 3:01
"My Way" (Anka, Claude François, Jacques Revaux, Gilles Thibault) – 4:57

 Tracks 10 and 12 recorded in Boston Garden, October 2, 1974
 Tracks 6 and 8 recorded at Buffalo Memorial Auditorium, October 4, 1974
 Track 5 recorded in Madison Square Garden, October 12, 1974
 Tracks 1–4, 7, 9, and 11 recorded in Madison Square Garden, October 13, 1974

Charts

Certifications

Personnel
 Frank Sinatra – Vocals
 Bill Miller - Pianist and Musical Director
 Al Viola - Guitar
 Gene Cherico - Bass
 Irv Cottler - Drums

Woody Herman and his Thundering Herd
Woody Herman was not present at the concerts
 Alto Saxophone: Jerry Dodgian, Frank Tiberi
 Tenor Saxophone: Gary M. Anderson, Gregory Herbert
 Baritone Saxophone: John Oslawski
 Trumpet: Gary Pack, Nelson Hiatt, Dave Stahl, Buddy Powers, Bill Byrne
 Trombone: Urbie Green, Dale Kirkland, Jim Pugh, Vaughn Weister
 Piano: Andy LaVerne
 Bass: Ron Paley
 Drums: David Carey

String section
 Violin: Joe Malin (lead violin), Peter Dimitriades, Dave Kunstler, Avram Weiss, Harry Urbont, Stan Karpienia, Max Hollander, Carmel Malin, Julius Brand, Peter Buonconsiglio, Max Cahn, Julius Schachter
 Viola: Vinnie Liota, Maurice Pollock, George Brown, Mike Spivakowsky
 Cello: Anthony Sophos, Alan Shulman, Gloria Lanzarone, Julius Ehrenworth
 Pedal Harp: Margaret Ross
Recording
Engineered by: Ed Green
Record Plant NY White Truck

See also
 Sinatra: New York (2009): features Frank Sinatra performing at Madison Square Garden from October 12, 1974.

References

Frank Sinatra live albums
1974 live albums
Reprise Records live albums
Albums recorded at Madison Square Garden
Albums recorded at the Boston Garden